August Schoefft (1809 – 1888) was a Hungarian painter of the 19th century. He spent more than one year in the Sikh Empire, arriving in 1841, where he painted portraits and scenes of the surrounding area. His best known works include The Court of Lahore and Maharaja Ranjit Singh at Darbar Sahib.

References

Hungarian painters
19th-century painters
1809 births
1888 deaths